Oleg Aleksandrovich Makeyev (born 24 February 1978) is a Russian professional football coach and a former player. He is an assistant coach with the Under-19 squad of FC Nizhny Novgorod.

Club career
He played in the Russian Football National League for FC Khimik Dzerzhinsk in the 2013–14 season.

References

External links
 

1978 births
People from Dzerzhinsk, Russia
Living people
Association football forwards
Russian footballers
FC Khimik Dzerzhinsk players
Russian football managers
Sportspeople from Nizhny Novgorod Oblast